Dui Rupaiyan, is a Nepali comedy, action and drama film, directed by Asim Shah. The song of the movie dui rupaiya, Kutu Ma Kutu is also the most famous and viewed Nepalese song on YouTube, with more than 100 million views.

Plot
This movie revolves around two friends, Jureli (Nischal Basnet) and Dari (Asif Shah), who smuggle gold illegally from India to Nepal. Their boss (Tika Pahari) gives them a Nepali two rupees note aka dui rupaiyaa. The serial number of the dui rupaiyaa is sent to the Indian party. One day while on their mission to smuggle, they stop by a restaurant which is owned by the ASP {Assistant Superintendent of Police} of the region. There Dari flirts with the ASP's wife, Maya (Menuka Pradhan), but is interrupted by the her son. To make him go away Dari gave him the dui rupaiyaa note given by their boss. Problems arise for Maya and Dari when Maya's husband the ASP (Buddhi Tamang) arrives, and Dari gets chased by him. However, Jureli manages to save him in the nick of time.

When they reach near the Indo-Nepali border Dari realises that he forgot the dui rupaiyaa note at Maya's hotel. Without the note the Indian party refuse to give the gold package and give both of them a day to find and bring the note to them. The next day Dari visits Maya where he came to know that the ASP has taken his phone and Maya doesn't want him in her life anymore. In order to get his phone back Dari and Jureli follow the ASI into a fun fair, where they both along with the ASP dance and flirt with the main dancer (Swastima Khadka). On coming out of the fair the ASP opens the phone and finds out that Dari is Maya's lover, due to which a fight ensues between the two. Even this time Jureli manages to saved Dari. Later that night Maya reveals that she was in a relationship with Dari, but was forced to marry the ASP for the sake of her father.

Dari and Jureli search for the note in the market but to no avail. So they decide to take help from Ghimire Thai (Rajan Ishan), a local goon of the region who trades peoples body parts illegally. However, they couldn't find the note, so Ghimire decides to trade their body parts. he forces both of them to eat sweets which have an intoxicating drug added to them. On the other hand, the ASP has made a sketch of Dari and threatens Maya that he won't spare Dari. Now, both Dari and Jureli are taken by Mandal, Ambulance wala (Rabindra Jha), whose Ambulance Jureli and Dari use for the smuggling so no one would suspect them and who also helps Ghimire trade the organs through his ambulance. After been saved by Mandal, the duo reveal the whole story to Mandal, who then is revealed to have cooperated with Ghimire.

On Ghimire's command they call the Indian party only for it to be revealed that they want to kill the duo and take the whole gold package for themselves. Since they lost the dui rupiyaa their lives are saved. A hilarious fight ensues between Ghimire's gang, the Indian party, Dari and Jureli and their boss. The duo manage to escape in Mandal's ambulance and the rest are arrested by the ASP. After dropping Mandal to hospital (who got shot in his bum), Dari found two pieces of gold in the ambulance seat, which Jureli had thrown in anger before the flight. The ASP, on the other hand praises himself and his team for catching the criminals (i.e. Jureli and Dari's boss's gang and Ghimire's gang) and giving all the credit to Maya.

The movie ends with the ASP's son revealing that he didn't spend the dui rupaiyaa and all that he did, was to get his own back on Dari for flirting with his mom. Jureli and Dari celebrate as now they are going to be billionaires.

Cast 
 Nischal Basnet as Jureli
 Asif Shah as Dari
 Rabindra Jha as Parmashower Prasad Mandal
 Rajan Ishan as Ghimire Thai
 Menuka Pradhan as Maya Tamang
 Buddhi Tamang as ASP Bom Bahadur Tamang
 Swastima Khadka as Dancer in the song kutu ma kutu
 Bisharad Basnet as Bada Bihari
 Pateek Raj Neupane as Judde
 Tika Pahari as Dari and Jureli's boss

Soundtrack 
Kutu Ma Kutu is the most viewed Nepali song on YouTube surpassing Surke Thaili Khai.

Awards

References

External links 
 

2010s crime comedy films
2017 action comedy films
2017 films
2017 romantic comedy films
Films produced by Nischal Basnet
Films shot in Kathmandu
Nepalese romantic comedy films